Robert Watson (11 September 1881–1947) was an English footballer who played in the Football League for Leeds City, Middlesbrough and Woolwich Arsenal.

References

1881 births
1947 deaths
English footballers
Association football forwards
English Football League players
South Bank F.C. players
Leeds City F.C. players
Middlesbrough F.C. players
Exeter City F.C. players
Arsenal F.C. players
Stalybridge Celtic F.C. players
Rochdale A.F.C. players
Chorley F.C. players